Sorry You're Not a Winner may refer to:

Sorry You're Not a Winner (EP), an EP by Enter Shikari
Sorry You're Not a Winner/OK Time for Plan B, a single by Enter Shikari